Belka (Белка, literally, "squirrel", or alternatively "Whitey") and Strelka (Стрелка, "little arrow") spent a day in space aboard Korabl-Sputnik 2 (Sputnik 5) on 19 August 1960 before safely returning to Earth. They are the first higher living organisms to survive a trip to outer space. 

They were accompanied by 42 mice, a grey rabbit, two rats, flies, and several plants and fungi. All passengers survived. They were the first Earth-born creatures to orbit the Earth and return alive, and the first recovered since February 20, 1947, when fruit flies were flown into space on a suborbital flight by the U.S. and survived.

Strelka went on to have six puppies with a male dog named Pushok who participated in many ground-based space experiments, but never made it into space. One of the puppies was named Pushinka (Пушинка, "Fluffy") and was presented to President John F. Kennedy by Nikita Khrushchev in 1961. A Kennedy dog named Charlie and Pushinka mated, resulting in the birth of four puppies that JFK referred to jokingly as pupniks. Two of their puppies, Butterfly and Streaker, were given away to children in the Midwest. The other two puppies, White Tips and Blackie, stayed at the Kennedy home on Squaw Island but were eventually given away to family friends. Pushinka's descendants were still living as of 2015. A photo of descendants of some of the Space Dogs is on display at the Zvezda Museum in Tomilino outside Moscow.

A Russian animated feature film called Belka and Strelka: Star Dogs (English title: Space Dogs) was released in 2010.

See also
 Animals in space
 Soviet space dogs
 List of individual dogs

References

Sputnik
Soviet cosmonauts
Individual dogs
Dogs in human culture